Rubén Ramírez Hidalgo decided not to defend his last year's title.
Ivo Minář won in the final against Peter Luczak 7–5, 6–3.

Seeds

Draw

Finals

Top half

Bottom half

References
 Main draw
 Qualifying draw

2011 Singles
Rabat,Singles